The Hypotheclini are a small tribe of butterflies in the family Lycaenidae.

Genera
The tribe contains a mere 2 genera at present, but as not all Theclinae have been assigned to tribes, the following list is preliminary:

 Hypochlorosis
 Hypothecla

References

  1973: The higher classification of the Lycaenidae (Lepidoptera): a tentative arrangement. Bulletin of the British Museum (Natural History), entomology, 28: 371-505. BHL

Theclinae
Butterfly tribes